Na Seung-hwa (born 8 October 1969) is a South Korean former footballer. He competed in the men's tournament at the 1992 Summer Olympics.

References

External links
 

1969 births
Living people
South Korean footballers
South Korea international footballers
Olympic footballers of South Korea
Footballers at the 1992 Summer Olympics
Place of birth missing (living people)
Association football defenders
Pohang Steelers players